Fontaine-Notre-Dame may refer to:

 Fontaine-Notre-Dame, Aisne, a commune in the department of Aisne in France
 Fontaine-Notre-Dame, Nord, a commune in the department of Nord in France